Sunendra Kumara (born 8 April 1973) is a Sri Lankan former cricketer. He played in 153 first-class and 74 List A matches between 1991/92 and 2011/12. He made his Twenty20 debut on 17 August 2004, for Ragama Cricket Club in the 2004 SLC Twenty20 Tournament.

References

External links
 

1973 births
Living people
Sri Lankan cricketers
Panadura Sports Club cricketers
Ragama Cricket Club cricketers
Place of birth missing (living people)